Joan Mir Mayrata (born 1 September 1997) is a Spanish Grand Prix motorcycle racer riding for the Repsol Honda Team, who is best known for winning the 2020 MotoGP World Championship with Suzuki. He is the fourth Spanish rider to win the premier class title after Àlex Crivillé, Jorge Lorenzo and Marc Márquez, and the second Mallorcan after Lorenzo. Mir has also won the 2017 Moto3 World Championship title with Leopard Racing.

Career

Early career
Palma-born Mir competed for two seasons in the Red Bull MotoGP Rookies Cup in 2013 and 2014, finishing with three wins and six podiums as runner-up to Jorge Martín in 2014. Mir contested the CEV Moto3 Junior World Championship in 2015. Mir won four of the first six races, but faded towards the end of the season, and ultimately finished fourth in the championship.

Moto3 World Championship
Mir made his Grand Prix début in 2015 with Leopard Racing at Phillip Island replacing the injured Hiroki Ono. Mir started 18th on the grid but failed to finish the race after an incident with John McPhee.

In 2016 Mir competed full-time in the Moto3 World Championship with Leopard Racing, partnering Fabio Quartararo and Andrea Locatelli. He achieved his first Grand Prix pole position and victory in just his 11th start at the Austrian round. He achieved a further two podiums in San Marino and Valencia. Mir finished the championship in 5th position as rookie of the year, scoring 144 points.

He remained for a second season in 2017 with Leopard Racing and dominated the class, taking 10 wins and 13 podiums from 18 races, only failing to score points at the Japanese round. His only pole position start of the season came at the Malaysian round. He finished 93 points ahead of his nearest rival, Romano Fenati, to win the Moto3 championship.

Moto2 World Championship
In 2018, Mir moved up to Moto2 with Marc VDS Racing Team, after signing a three-year deal with the team. He finished 3rd in France and Italy, and finished 2nd in Germany and Australia, ending the season with four podiums and 155 points, 6th place in the rider's championship, and winning rookie of the year.

MotoGP World Championship

Team Suzuki Ecstar (2019–2022)

2019 
 In mid 2018, it was announced that Mir would end his contract with Marc VDS two years prematurely, in order to move up to the premier class with the Suzuki factory team on a two-year deal to replace the outgoing Andrea Iannone. He became just the second rider to be promoted to MotoGP after a lone season in Moto2, after Maverick Viñales. In his rookie season in 2019, he achieved consistent top-10 finishes but missed two rounds due to a pulmonary contusion suffered in a crash in testing at Brno. He was replaced by Suzuki test rider Sylvain Guintoli. Mir achieved a season-best finish of 5th place in Australia. He finished the season with 92 points, 12th in the overall standings, and as the second best rookie, behind former Moto3 Leopard Racing teammate Fabio Quartararo.

2020 
Before the delayed start to the 2020 season, Suzuki announced that Mir had been signed for a further two years, ensuring his future with the team through at least 2022. Mir had a rough start to the season, crashing out of two of the first three rounds. However, he quickly found his rhythm and became a consistent podium finisher, achieving a podium spot in five of the next seven rounds (three 2nd places in Austria, Emilia-Romagna and Catalunya, and two 3rd-place finishes in San Marino and Aragon). Inconsistent finishes from his title rivals such as 3-time race winner Quartararo and Maverick Viñales meant that after 10 of 14 rounds, Mir led the championship standings despite not having won a race until that point.

During the tenth round of the 2020 Grand Prix motorcycle racing season, at the 2020 French motorcycle Grand Prix, Mir lost his balance on entering a left turn and slid on his side for about 50 metres before managing to use the momentum as he entered the gravel pit to seamlessly regain his footing and fluidly transfer his momentum into a running action. Mir was still able to come 11th and salvage 5 points.

A further podium finish in Teruel and poor results from Quartararo, Viñales and Andrea Dovizioso saw Mir extend his championship advantage to 14 points over second-place Quartararo with three races remaining. At the European Grand Prix, staged at the Circuit Ricardo Tormo near Valencia, Mir took his maiden win, beating his teammate Álex Rins, who finished in second place. With Quartararo falling early in the race and only able to salvage 2 points, Mir took a commanding 37-point lead over both his rivals with only 2 rounds remaining. The following week at the Valencian Community Grand Prix at the same circuit, Mir finished in 7th place, while Rins managed only 4th and Quartararo crashed out, crowning Mir the 2020 MotoGP riders' champion. He became the first Suzuki rider to win the title since Kenny Roberts Jr. in 2000, the first non-Honda or non-Yamaha rider to win the title since Ducati rider Casey Stoner in 2007, as well as the first Moto3 world champion to win the premier class title.

2021 

Mir started the 2021 season with back to back top ten performances in Qatar. Despite qualifying tenth during the first race and forgetting to engage his Suzuki's launch control at the start he managed to work his way up into second place on the last lap of the race before getting passed on the back straight by Ducati riders Johann Zarco and Francesco Bagnaia, leading to a 4th-place finish. In the second race the following week Mir qualified in the middle of the field and finished 7th behind teammate Rins, but the race was most notable for Mir's confrontation with factory Ducati rider, Jack Miller. The confrontation started when Mir attempted an overtake in which he had to pick up his bike mid corner, nearly forcing Miller off the track. Miller later collided with Mir heading down the back straight, and after the race Mir was highly critical of Miller and argued that the Australian's actions were intentional. Two weeks later in Portimao Mir started ninth and worked his way up to finish 3rd behind Fabio Quartararo and Bagnaia, earning Suzuki's first podium for the season. Mir achieved a 5th place at Jerez before a crash at Le Mans in wet conditions, and his second podium in 3rd place in Mugello. Catalunya saw Mir finish in 5th once again, but was promoted to 4th following Fabio Quartararo’s 5-second penalty for removing his chest protector and riding with his leathers open. Following a 9th place at Sachsenring, Mir finished 3rd in Assen, earning his third podium of the year, as the season went into the summer break. At the grid returned to race for the double round in Spielberg, Austria, Mir collected his fourth podium of the season with a 2nd-place finish behind rookie Ducati rider Jorge Martín, who took his maiden MotoGP victory. Mir would finish 3rd in Aragón, and replicated his best result of the season with a 2nd-place finish in Portimao, before closing off the year with a 4th-place finish in Valencia, the season ender race. He finished 3rd in the rider's championship with 208 points, 44 points behind Francesco Bagnaia in second, and 70 points behind World Champion Fabio Quartararo.

2022 
Mir missed a few rounds due to injuries sustained in Austria.

Repsol Honda Team (from 2023)

2023 
Following Suzuki's departure from MotoGP, Mir signed with Repsol Honda for the 2023 season. He will partner six-time premier class champion Marc Márquez.

Career statistics

Red Bull MotoGP Rookies Cup

Races by year
(key) (Races in bold indicate pole position, races in italics indicate fastest lap)

FIM CEV Moto3 Junior World Championship

Races by year
(key) (Races in bold indicate pole position; races in italics indicate fastest lap)

Grand Prix motorcycle racing

By season

By class

Races by year
(key) (Races in bold indicate pole position; races in italics indicate fastest lap)

References

External links

1997 births
Living people
Spanish motorcycle racers
Moto3 World Championship riders
People from Palma de Mallorca
Moto2 World Championship riders
Suzuki MotoGP riders
MotoGP World Championship riders
MotoGP World Riders' Champions
Moto3 World Riders' Champions